John Halligan Jr. (4 May 1876 – 11 December 1934) was an admiral of the United States Navy in the early 20th century.

Biography
Halligan, born on 4 May 1876 in South Boston, Massachusetts, graduated from the United States Naval Academy at the head of his class in 1898. He served during the Spanish–American War in the armored cruiser , flagship of Commodore Winfield S. Schley. During World War I he was chief of staff to Vice Admiral Henry Braid Wilson Commander, U.S. Naval Forces, France, and for his outstanding performance of duty he received the Distinguished Service Medal.

After the Armistice, he commanded the battleship , and in 1925 became chief of the Bureau of Engineering with the temporary rank of rear admiral. After qualifying as a naval aviation observer, he commanded the aircraft carrier  from September 1928 to April 1929. He served as Assistant Chief of Naval Operations in 1930, and in 1933 became Commander Aircraft, Battle Force. Appointed Rear Admiral in 1930, Halligan died at Puget Sound, Washington, 11 December 1934, while serving as Commandant, 13th Naval District.

Namesake
In 1943, the destroyer  was named in his honor.

References

External links 
 

1876 births
1934 deaths
United States Navy admirals
United States Naval Academy alumni
People from Boston
Burials at the United States Naval Academy Cemetery
Recipients of the Navy Distinguished Service Medal
Military personnel from Massachusetts